Avonside Girls' High School is a large urban high school in Christchurch, New Zealand, with more than 1,000 girls from Year 9 to Year 13. It was formerly in the suburb of Avonside but moved in 2019, along with Shirley Boys' High School, to the former QEII Park site in the east of Christchurch.

History
The school originally opened in January 1919 on the Avonside Drive site as a satellite campus of Christchurch Girls' High School. It became a separate school in its own right in 1928.

Earthquake
Following the 22 February 2011 Christchurch earthquake, the school site closed, with classes operating at Burnside High School in the afternoons. Two school blocks, including the Main Block, were condemned following the earthquake and were demolished.

Students returned to the Avonside site at the beginning of 2012, with relocatable and prefabricated classrooms filling gaps left by the condemned buildings, but due to significant land damage adjacent to the school site, it was clear that the school might need to close or relocate. Education Minister Hekia Parata announced on 16 October 2013 that the school would move, and be co-located with Shirley Boys' High School at a new site in east Christchurch, and on 12 Feb 2015 the site was confirmed to be the former QEII Park site – and the move was complete in April 2019.

Notable staff
Before she entered politics, Marian Hobbs was principal of the school. Jean Herbison, later New Zealand's first female chancellor of a New Zealand university, taught at the school from 1952 to 1959.

References

External links
Education Review Office (ERO) reports

Girls' schools in New Zealand
Educational institutions established in 1919
Secondary schools in Christchurch
1919 establishments in New Zealand